Idaville is a census-designated place in Lincoln Township, White County, in the U.S. state of Indiana.

History
Idaville was originally called Hannah, and under the latter name was laid out in 1860, when the railroad was extended to that point. A post office has been in operation under the name Idaville since 1860.

Geography

Demographics

The 2010 population of Idaville, Indiana was 461 people, made up of 253 males, and 208 females.

The estimated median household income was $53,060 in 2017.

Idaville is mentioned in the Season 07 Ep 13 of M*A*S*H, Out of Gas ...

References

Census-designated places in White County, Indiana
Census-designated places in Indiana